The Battle of Fatshan Creek (佛山水道之戰) was a naval engagement fought between the United Kingdom's Royal Navy and the Cantonese fleet of Qing China on 1 June 1857. Rear-Admiral Sir Michael Seymour sought out and destroyed the Chinese fleet before advancing to the city of Canton (modern-day Foshan) for its capture.

British order of battle

Gallery

See also
Battle of Escape Creek

References

External links

Sources

 

 

 

 

1857 in China
Fatshan Creek
China–United Kingdom relations
Fatshan Creek
Fatshan Creek
Fatshan Creek
June 1857 events